The 1960 CCCF Youth Championship was an age restricted association football competition organised by the CCCF (English: Football Confederation of Central America and the Caribbean). All games were hosted in Tegucigalpa, Honduras and took place between 14 and 28 August.

See also
Football competitions in Honduras
Football in Central America

References

Under-19 association football competitions
1960 in youth association football